Olympia is a feminine given name. Notable people with the name include:

 Olympia Mancini, Countess of Soissons (1638–1708), second-eldest of the five celebrated Mancini sisters and mother of Austrian general Prince Eugene of Savoy
 Olympia von und zu Arco-Zinneberg (born 1988), French princess by marriage
 Olympia Aldersey (born 1992), Australian world and Olympic champion rower
 Olympia Brown (1835–1926), American minister and suffragist
 Olympia Campbell (born 1995), British fashion model
 Olympia Dukakis (1931–2021), American actress
 Olympia Hartauer, female professional wrestler from the Gorgeous Ladies of Wrestling
 Olympia LePoint (born 1976), American author, professional speaker and rocket scientist
 Olympia Paus (born 1976), Norwegian shipping heiress and equestrienne
 Olympia Scott (born 1976), American former Women's National Basketball Association player, former college coach and entrepreneur
 Olympia Snowe (born 1947), U.S. Senator from Maine
 Olympia Ann "Olan" Sylvers (born 1951), member of the family singing group The Sylvers
 Olympia Valance (born 1993), Australian actress

Feminine given names